Arild Rosenkrantz (9 April 1870 – 28 September 1964) was a Danish nobleman painter, sculptor, stained glass artist and illustrator.

Early life

Arild Rosenkrantz was born in 1870 to Baron Iver Holger Rosenkrantz, a Danish diplomat, and Julia Louise Mackenzie, a Scottish socialite and medium, at Frederiksborg Castle. His father died when Rosenkrantz was only three years old. He accompanied his mother on her journeys to Italy, Scotland and England. She moved to Italy permanently in 1891 and was a spiritual medium.

He married Louise Augusta (Tessa) Mackenzie, a Scottish cousin, in 1901.

Education and career
In Rome he studied art under Professor Modesto Faustini in 1887; Faustini imparted an appreciation for the Italian masters that influenced Rosenkrantz's work. There was a dreamy, emotional quality to his work throughout his artistic career as a painter and stained glass artist. Two years later he studied under Jean-Paul Laurens and Benjamin Constant at the Académie Julian in Paris. He was also influenced by the Pre-Raphaelites, painters of the French salon, Romantic artists J.M.W. Turner and William Blake and Impressionist artist Claude Monet.

He was studying in the United States in 1894 and 1895 and made glasswork for Tiffany. Later he made stained glass windows in a wide range of English churches and mansions.

From 1898 he stayed in London, where he developed his reputation as an artist. In London, Rosenkrantz joined the Anthroposophic Society. In 1912 he met Austrian philosopher Rudolf Steiner personally.  Two years later he and his wife moved to Dornach, Switzerland to participate in the decoration of the anthroposophical center Goetheanum with other artists. Steiner, who taught Rosenkrantz of colors intrinsic properties, said: "Colours are the soul of nature and the entire cosmos – and we become part of that soul when we live with the colours".

Rosenkrantz returned to London with his wife after Steiner died in 1925. He then took up several artistic pursuits for Anthroposophic theatres: he designed costumes, created stage decorations and decorated the interior of 2 theatres. He also worked as a teacher and held annual exhibitions.

Rosenkrantz is

Later years
Rosenkrantz came to Denmark in the fall of 1939 to organize an exhibition in Copenhagen for his 70th birthday on 9 April 1940. However, German troops crossed over the Danish border and returning to London was impossible. His relatives at Rosenholm Castle in Jutland offered their home to Rosenkrantz and his wife, who then died in 1944. After that, he decided to stay in Denmark at the East Jutland castle. He worked more than 20 additional years creating works, exhibiting them, and lecturing.

Influenced by anthroposophy through Rudolf Steiner and theories by Goethe, Rosenkrantz's works reflected a bold use of color. The Rosenholm Castle holds a number of his oil paintings and pastels.

He died in September 1964.

Works
Stained Glass
He made stained glass windows for churches, houses and castles while he lived in England.
 Cadogan Hall, Chelsea, London. Built as a Church of Christ Scientist in 1907.
 St Andrew's east window, Wickhambreaux, Kent; it was made in John LaFarge's New York studio This window was fabricated by The Decorative Stained Glass Company in 1896, 11 years after the John LaFarge Studio was dissolved.
 A church in Tasmania and Juelsminde Church in Denmark have his work.
 Holy Trinity's east window, Churchover, Warwickshire
 Four windows in St. Nicholas, Taplow, Buckinghamshire Stained Glass of Buckinghamshire Churches
Southwick Church of Scotland Parish Church in Kirkcudbrightshire. Late 19th century stained glass window for the McTaggart-Stewart family of Southwick House.

Paintings and illustrations
Examples of his works include:
 Cupid and Psyche, the symbolist paintings, 1896, Rosenholm Castle, Denmark
 The Tempter, 1896, Rosenholm Castle, Denmark
 The Duchess of Grafton, a portrait of his cousin, 1905, Rosenholm Castle, Denmark
 The Omnipresent, 1907, Rosenholm Castle, Denmark
 Royal Academy of Music paintings, before 1911, Royal Academy of Music, London
 Tales of Mystery and Adventure illustrations for Edgar Allan Poe's Danish edition.
 Golgotha
 The Last Supper
 The Hierophant
 Madonna
 Michael 
 Wisdom
 The Messenger
 Series of four pictures from the Creation: The Mineral World, The Plant World, The Animal World and Man – and The Seven Apocalyptic Seals.

Sculpture
 Bronze Christ figure for St George's Camberwell, London.

Publications
 Baron Arild Rosenkrantz. (1967). A new impulse in art. New Knowledge.

Exhibitions
His exhibitions included: 
 Sar Peladan's "Salon de la Rose+Croix" in between 1892 and 1894.
 Exhibitions in Copenhagen
 Exhibitions in London
 Tales of Mystery and Adventure illustrations for Edgar Allan Poe's Danish edition were exhibited in 1909.
 Annual exhibitions between about 1925 and 1939
 "Gold & Magic" exhibition at Arken, Danish museum of contemporary art, October 3, 2020-May 2021

References

Further reading
 Biography of Baron Arild Rosenkrantz. Rudolf Steiner Archive.
 Fletcher, John. (1 December 1987). Art Inspired by Rudolf Steiner. Rudolf Steiner Press. .
 Rosenkrantz, Arild. (1922). Fruits of Anthroposophy: An Introduction to the Works of Dr. Rudolf Steiner London: The Threefold Commonwealth.
 "A Window for England: The First American Stained Galss to go Abroad." The New York Times. 10 July 1896.

External links

 Arild Rosenkrantz site Biography, gallery of some of his works
 Rosenholm Castle, Denmark

1870 births
1964 deaths
British stained glass artists and manufacturers
Danish stained glass artists and manufacturers
20th-century Danish artists
19th-century Danish nobility
20th-century Danish nobility
Anthroposophists
Rosenkrantz family